Sir Peter Michael Williams,  (born 22 March 1945) is a British physicist.

Education
Williams was educated at Hymers College and completed his undergraduate degree at Trinity College, Cambridge, in 1966, and his PhD at Selwyn College, Cambridge, with a thesis entitled "Defect structure and luminescent properties of semiconductors" in 1969.

Career
He began an academic career at Selwyn College, Cambridge. He then moved to industry and worked first at VG Instruments and later Oxford Instruments. He was chairman of Oxford Instruments from 1991 until his retirement in 1999.

Sir Peter is currently chairman of the National Physical Laboratory and vice-president and treasurer of the Royal Society. He was previously master of St Catherine's College, Oxford (2000–2002), president of the Institute of Physics (2000–2002), president of the British Association for the Advancement of Science (2002–2003) and chairman of the UK's Engineering and Technology Board (2001–2006). He has been a member of the InterAcademy Council's Committee to Review the Intergovernmental Panel on Climate Change that reported in August 2010.

In 2005 Williams became the fifth chancellor of the University of Leicester. He was also appointed patron for research at Marie Curie Cancer Care. He retired from this position in 2010. In 2015 Williams was appointed chairman of Kromek, an innovative British tech company making detectors for the medical, security and nuclear sectors.

Awards
He was elected as Fellow of the Royal Academy of Engineering in 1996. He received the CBE in 1992 and was knighted in the Queen's Birthday Honours list of 1998.

He was elected a fellow of the Royal Society in May 1999.

He won the Richard Glazebrook Medal and Prize in 2005.

Other work
He was on the governing body of Abingdon School from 1997 to 2000.

References

Further reading
Commentaries – Sir Peter Williams, Department of Trade & Industry, 2004
Patron Council Members (PDF), The BA, 2003
New Heads of House, Oxford Blueprint, 10 October 2002
New Chancellor Installed at Ceremony (PDF), Bulletin, University of Leicester, December 2005 / January 2006
Sir Peter Williams is new research patron, Marie Curie Cancer Care, 2005 news archive

1945 births
Living people
People educated at Hymers College
Alumni of Trinity College, Cambridge
Alumni of Selwyn College, Cambridge
Academics of Imperial College London
Commanders of the Order of the British Empire
Knights Bachelor
People associated with the University of Leicester
Masters of St Catherine's College, Oxford
Fellows of the Royal Society
Presidents of the Institute of Physics
Presidents of the British Science Association
Presidents of the Association for Science Education
Governors of Abingdon School